Pavel Pilík (born 13 February 1992 in Příbram) is a professional Czech football player who plays for Austrian club SV Waidhofen/Thaya.

Career

SV Waidhofen/Thaya
In February 2020, Pilík moved to Austria and signed with SV Sparkasse Waidhofen/Thaya.

References

External links
 Profile at iDNES.cz
 Guardian Football
 Pavel Pilík at Soccerway

Czech footballers
Czech expatriate footballers
1992 births
Living people
Sportspeople from Příbram
Czech First League players
Czech National Football League players
1. FK Příbram players
FK Bohemians Prague (Střížkov) players
FC Silon Táborsko players
FK Slavoj Vyšehrad players
FK Ústí nad Labem players
FC Sellier & Bellot Vlašim players
Association football forwards
Czech expatriate sportspeople in Austria
Expatriate footballers in Austria